The Association of Rugby League Clubs (Russian: Ассоциация Регбилиг Клубов) is the governing body for rugby league in Russia. The association was formed in 2010, bringing together amateur clubs and regional RRLF clubs after the expulsion of the Russian Rugby League Federation and essentially rugby league itself by the Order of the Ministry of Tourism RUSSIA № 21 from State Register of Sports of Russia.

History

After the turmoil of the RRLF losing clubs and players after "the crisis of 2009-2010", Edward Taturian split from the previous body and formed the "Association of Rugby League Clubs" (ARLC). After no clear framework or competition was introduced by the RRLF in 2010, the ARLC conducted regional league of "North-West", "Center" and "South" all originally consisting of 6 teams each. The following year it was inducted into the "SNNVS Russia" and followed with becoming a full-member of the Rugby League European Federation on the 22 February 2013 and the Rugby League International Federation on the 8 August 2013.

Competitions
As of 2016 the ARLC administrated the "Rugby League Tournament" (ТУРНИР ПО РЕГБИ ЛИГ) and a number of conference leagues. 
The 2016 season consists of the following sides: 
- RK CSKA, Moscow 
- RC Dynamo, Moscow 
- RK Fili, Fili 
- Lokomotiv, Moscow 
- RK NARA, Naro-Fominsk 
- RK Polar Bears, Moscow 
- RLC Storm, Moscow 
- Vereya Bears, Vereya 
 Note: This tournament is made up of the best performing teams from the conference leagues.

National Championship results
 Soviet Championship 
1990 - Moscow Magicians 
1991 - Tiraspol Aeolis 

 CIS Championship 
1992 - RC Lokomotiv Moscow 
1993 - RC Lokomotiv Moscow 
1994 - Moscow Magicians 
1995 - Kazan Arrows 
1996 - 
1997 -

 Russian Championship 
1998 - Kazan Arrows 
1999 - Kazan Arrows 
2000 - RC Lokomotiv Moscow 
2001 - Kazan Arrows 
2002 - RC Lokomotiv Moscow 
2003 - RC Lokomotiv Moscow 
2004 - RC Lokomotiv Moscow 
2005 - RC Lokomotiv Moscow 
2006 - RC Lokomotiv Moscow 
2007 - RC Lokomotiv Moscow 
2008 - RC Lokomotiv Moscow 
2009 - RC Lokomotiv Moscow 
2010 - 
2011 - 
2012 - 
2013- Vereya Bears 
2014 - RC Lokomotiv Moscow 
2015 - Vereya Bears

See also

Russia national rugby league team
Rugby league in Russia
Russian Championship

References

External links

Rugby league in Russia
Rugby league governing bodies in Europe
Sports governing bodies in Russia